Ctenusa varians is a moth of the family Noctuidae. The species can be found in Somalia south to South Africa.

References 

Catocalinae
Moths described in 1863
Owlet moths of Africa